Mikadotrochus beyrichii, common name Beyrich's slit shell, is a species of sea snail, a marine gastropod mollusk in the family Pleurotomariidae.

It was discovered by Franz Martin Hilgendorf in an ancient Japanese collection.

Description
The size of the shell varies between 50 mm and 100 mm. The shell has a trochiform shape. It is as high as broad. It has a flat base. It shows moderately numerous spiral lines. It is pale yellow, beautifully flamed with 11 red whorls that are regularly increasing. The penultimate whorl has 8 lirae above, 2 in and 2 under the slit fasciole. These lirae are beset with weak nodules, about 3 times as long (in the direction of the spiral) as high or broad. The body whorl has a blunt angle at its base. This base contains 20 concentric lirae, and in the middle a deep pit or "false umbilicus". On the outside it is white, on the inside it is pearly. The thick, pearly columellar margin is S-shaped.

Distribution
M. beyrichii is endemic to the coastal waters of Japan. and China

References

 Dautzenberg, Ph.; Fischer, H. (1898). Note sur le Pleurotomaria beyrichi. J. conchyliol. XLVI: 218–224, plate XI
 Williams S.T., Karube S. & Ozawa T. (2008) Molecular systematics of Vetigastropoda: Trochidae, Turbinidae and Trochoidea redefined. Zoologica Scripta 37: 483–506

External links
 

Pleurotomariidae
Taxa named by Franz Martin Hilgendorf
Gastropods described in 1877